The subjunctive mood (Greek  "for arranging underneath", from  "I arrange beneath") along with the indicative, optative, and imperative, is one of the four moods of the Ancient Greek verb. It can be used both in the meaning "should" (the jussive subjunctive) and in the meaning "may" (the potential subjunctive).

The main uses of the subjunctive in Greek are as follows:

(a) When used in its jussive sense, the subjunctive can be used in sentences such as the following:
 To make 1st person suggestions ("let me say", "let's go")
 In deliberative questions ("what should I do?")
 To make negative commands ("don't be surprised!")

(b) The potential subjunctive is used in indefinite subordinate clauses like the following, introduced by a word such as  "if by chance" containing the particle :
 "If by chance...", "until such time as..." or "before such time as..." referring to a single event at an indefinite future time
 "Whenever...", "whoever...", "if ever..." etc. referring to repeated events in an indefinite present time

When the context is past, the optative is used in such clauses, without the particle .

(c) The potential subjunctive, usually without , is also used in subordinate clauses such as the following:
 Purpose clauses ("so that it can happen")  
 After verbs of fearing or doubt ("I fear it may happen", "I doubt if it can happen")

In a past time context either the subjunctive or the optative mood may be used in such sentences.

(d) Without an introductory verb, but preceded by  "not", the potential subjunctive can also be used for:
 Doubtful or emphatic assertions about the future ("it may be that.." or "it is certain that...")

The two moods subjunctive and optative together cover most of the areas covered by the Latin subjunctive. However, one area for which the subjunctive is used in Latin but not in Greek is for counterfactual situations in the present or past (e.g. "it would be happening (but isn't)", "it would have happened (but didn't)", "I should have done it (but didn't)" etc.). For this area of meaning the imperfect and aorist indicative tenses are used in Ancient Greek.

The subjunctive is still used today in Modern Greek, whereas the optative has died out.

It exists in three tenses only: the present, the aorist, and the perfect. The perfect is, however, rarely used. 

The difference between the present and aorist subjunctive is one of aspect rather than of time. In sentences looking forward to the future such as "I am afraid it may happen", the aorist describes single events, whereas the present subjunctive primarily refers to situations or habitually repeated events. In sentences describing repeated events at an indefinite time such as "whenever he has finished, he sits down", the aorist refers to events which, though repeated, precede the time of the main verb.

Except sometimes in Homer, the negative used with the subjunctive is always .

Uses

Jussive subjunctive
Just as in Latin, the Greek subjunctive can sometimes be used for giving suggestions or commands. This use is known as the "jussive" subjunctive.

1st person suggestions
The jussive subjunctive has several uses. One use is in 1st person plural exhortations (the "hortatory" subjunctive):
 .
 .
 Come now, let's go.

 .
 .
 Come now, let me show you.

Since Ancient Greek has a 3rd person imperative, the imperative rather than the subjunctive is usually used for 3rd person commands or suggestions where Latin would use a 3rd person subjunctive (e.g. veniat "let him come").

Deliberative questions
Similarly the subjunctive is used in deliberative questions, usually in the 1st person:
 
 
 Should we speak (aorist) or should we remain silent (present)?

Negative commands
The subjunctive mood can also be used for 2nd person negative commands, but only with the aorist tense. The negative, as with almost all uses of the subjunctive, is  :
 .
 . (aorist subjunctive)
 Don't be surprised.

However, when the meaning of the negative command is "don't continue to do something",  is used not with the subjunctive but with the present imperative:
 .
 . (present imperative)
 Don't weep (= don't continue to weep).

Subjunctive in indefinite clauses
The subjunctive mood is often used in indefinite subordinate clauses referring to an unknown time in the future (e.g. "if this should happen") or to an unspecified time in the present (e.g. "whenever this happens"). Such clauses are always introduced by a conjunction or relative pronoun combined with the particle , such as  "if by chance",  "whenever", or  "whoever". 

Clauses of this type can only refer to an indefinite present or future time, never to the past, for which the optative is used, without  (see Optative (Ancient Greek)).

If (in future)
Conditional sentences of this kind are referred to by Smyth as the "more vivid" future conditions:
 .
 .
 If it's necessary, we shall make war.

The negative used with the potential subjunctive, as with the jussive subjunctive, is :
 .
 .
 If they are not willing, they will force them.

Before, until
The same construction is used with  "before" and  "until such time as" referring to an event or situation which it is expected will occur at an indefinite future time:
 .
 .
 I shan't stop until you tell me (whenever that is).

 .
 .
 Speak, until it is time to go home (whenever that is).

Whenever, whoever, etc. 
Another very similar use of the subjunctive is in indefinite subordinate clauses following a conjunction such as  "if ever",  "whenever",  "whoever", etc., referring to repeated actions in indefinite present time.
 .
 .
 So everyone is powerful who does whatever he wants whenever he wants.

 .
 .
 Whenever anyone tries to pass, they roll stones.

 .
 .
 It's possible for exiles to live wherever they wish.

 .
 .
 Wherever they make a camp, they throw a ditch around it.

 means "in whatever way". But it can also mean "so that" and be used in purpose clauses (see below).

 .
 .
 I shall do as (= in whatever way) you order.

The equivalent of this construction in past time uses the optative mood without  (see Optative (Ancient Greek)). Unlike with purpose clauses and after verbs of fearing, the subjunctive is not used in a past-time context in such clauses.

Other uses of the subjunctive

Purpose clauses
 .
 .
 Teach me too, so that I can become wiser.

On the other hand, when  is used,  is usually added, although  can also be used alone:

 
 
 But let someone bring out some fire, so that we can pray to the gods.

 
 
 But so that it may be known that what I'm saying is true, first I shall describe the nature of Attica.

In a past context purpose clause, the optative mood without  is often used (see Optative (Ancient Greek)), but it is also possible to use the subjunctive even in a past context:
 
  (aorist subjunctive)
 Abrocomas had burnt the boats, so that Cyrus couldn't cross.

After verbs of fearing
The subjunctive is used after verbs of fearing to express fears for the future, after a verb of fearing in the present tense. In this case the word  "lest" is always added after the verb of fearing:
 
 
 He is afraid that we may be besieged.

In a past context the optative mood is generally used instead of the subjunctive (see Optative (Ancient Greek). However, as with purpose clauses, the subjunctive may optionally be used even when the context is past:
 
 
 They were afraid at first that (the ships) might be (lit. may be) hostile.

Doubts can be expressed in Ancient Greek by using   "if" or an indirect question and the subjunctive after a verb of fearing:
 
 
 I doubt if I can persuade my mistress.

When the sentence has the form "I fear that something is the case or was the case", referring to the present or past, the indicative, not the subjunctive, is used.

Doubtful and emphatic assertions
 
 
 Possibly it may not be so.

 
 
 Certainly there won't be enough (oil) both for us and for you!

Tense and the subjunctive
The subjunctive, like the imperative, is found in only three tenses: the present, aorist, and perfect. The difference between these tenses is generally not one of time, but of aspect. Thus when a subjunctive verb is used prospectively to refer to a future event or situation (e.g. "I am afraid it may happen"), the aorist is used to refer to an event, the present to a situation (or habitual series of events):

 
 
 Should we speak (event – aorist subjunctive) or should we remain silent (situation – present subjunctive)?

"whenever he has spoken, he sits down"), the aorist refers to an event which takes place earlier than the main verb:

 
 
 And when all of these men have spoken, then (the herald) orders any of the other Athenians who wishes to speak, to say his piece.

But when the subjunctive verb in an indefinite clause refers to a situation which is simultaneous with the time of the main verb, the present subjunctive is used:
 .
 .
 Whenever a king is leading, no one walks in front of him.

 .
 .
 We are all mad whenever we are angry.

The perfect subjunctive also refers to a situation existing at the time of the main verb, but as a result of something which happened earlier, as in the example below:
 .
 .
 Whether (the hare) has been caught or not, (the huntsman) should make it clear (to his colleagues).

Morphology

The order of the endings in the tables below is: "I", "you sg.", "he/she/it", "we", "you pl.",  "they".

A 2nd and 3rd person dual number (e.g.  "you both may be",  "they both may be") also exists but in most verbs it is rare. It is omitted from these tables.

  "I go" is almost always used with a prefix (e.g.  etc.) except in poetry.
 The perfect subjunctive is very rare.

 The aorist endings ,  etc. are sometimes middle in meaning.

References

Ancient Greek
Greek grammar
Grammatical moods